Hugh James Campbell-Ferguson (born 8 February 1940) is a former English cricketer.  Campbell-Ferguson was a right-handed batsman who played primarily as a wicketkeeper.  He was born at Royston, Hertfordshire.

Campbell-Ferguson made his debut for Cambridgeshire in the 1965 Gillette Cup against Warwickshire.  He represented Cambridgeshire in one further List-A match against Oxfordshire in the 1965 Gillette Cup.

Campbell-Ferguson also represented Cambridgeshire in the Minor Counties Championship, making his debut in that competition against Shropshire in 1965. From 1965 to 1967, he represented the county in 6 Minor Counties matches, with his final Minor Counties appearance coming against Lincolnshire.

References

External links
James Campbell-Ferguson at Cricinfo
James Campbell-Ferguson at CricketArchive

1940 births
Living people
People from Royston, Hertfordshire
English cricketers
Cambridgeshire cricketers
Wicket-keepers